The Mount Union Purple Raiders football program represents the University of Mount Union in college football at the NCAA Division III level as members of the Ohio Athletic Conference (OAC). Mount Union have played their home games at Mount Union Stadium in Alliance, Ohio since 1913, which makes it the oldest college football stadium in Ohio. The Purple Raiders have claimed 13 NCAA Division III Football Championship and 30 OAC titles and have 12 undefeated seasons. 

Mount Union's first game was an 18–0 loss at home to Kenyon College, from Gambier, Ohio, on November 7, 1893. The first program victory came 11 days later in a 20–0 win over Salem University in Salem, West Virginia. The team competed as an independent from 1893 until 1913, and joined the OAC in 1914.

The Purple Raiders played in the OAC for 71 years before winning their first conference title, which came in 1985 under coach Ken Wable. Since then, the program has won 30 titles in 35 years, including a 24-year streak from 1992 to 2015. During this run, the Purple Raiders went 214–2 versus OAC opponents. The title-streak spanned two coaches, Larry Kehres and Vince Kehres. John Carroll University ended the streak by winning the OAC title in 2016 where they defeated Mount Union 31–28 on November 12, 2016.

History

Beginnings (1893–1913)
The first football game played by Mount Union was on the school's baseball field on November 7, 1893 against Kenyon College. In their first year they went 1–2, with their lone win coming against Salem University. The following season, the team had their first coach, Coach Davis, who led them to a 4–5 record. In 1895 and 1898 the team failed to field a team, but was able to have their first winning season, under Coach Battles in 1899, with a 5–1–1 record.

It wasn't until 1903 and 1904 that the program maintained a head coach for two consecutive years, which was Pearl Sommerville, who went 4–11–1 in his two seasons. The program built stability when Robert Dawson took over as coach in 1909 and oversaw the program as it joined the Ohio Athletic Conference (OAC) in 1914.

A growing program (1914–1961)
In addition to Dawson's eight-year tenure and a transition to the OAC, Mount Union Stadium was built which gave the program a permanent home and even more stability. Over the course of Dawson's career, he went 49–24–4 (10–7, OAC). 

From 1920 to 1921, Mount Union was coached by Eddie Casey, who went on to be inducted into the College Football Hall of Fame in 1968. Following his time at Mount Union, he coached Harvard, the National Football League's Washington Redskins, and the American Football League's Boston Bears. 

John M. Thorpe coached the Purple Raiders from 1922 to 1931, compiling a 55–32–7 (42–22–4, OAC) record. During his tenure, he served as both head coach and athletic director for the school. He was followed by Harry Geltz (1932–1941), who was unable to match his long-term success and left the program in 1941, when he went 1–15–1 (0–11, OAC) in his final two years.

Pete Pederson was hired in 1942, but after one season the program was suspended due to World War II. The program remained suspended for three seasons and returned under Pederson in 1946. Pederson left after the 1949 season to take over as head coach at Marshall.

Ken Wable era (1962–1985)
Ken Wable was hired as the head coach for the Purple Raiders in 1962. He had previously served as an assistant coach at Wake Forest, Muskingum, and Cornell. Wable coached at Mount Union for 24 seasons, where he went 123–95–2. Beginning in 1979, Wable coached the team to a winning record of 7–2, and every season since, the program has maintained a winning record. Wable was named OAC Coach of the Year in 1982 and 1985. In 1985, he led the Purple Raiders to their first conference title and first berth in the NCAA Division III Football Playoffs.

Larry Kehres era (1986–2012)
Larry Kehres became the athletic director at Mount Union. In 1986, he took over as head football coach. His teams have won 11 NCAA Division III Football Championships (1993, 1996–1998, 2000–2002, 2005–2006, 2008, 2012).

Kehres' teams hold several NCAA records. In addition to owning the two longest winning streaks in NCAA history, 54 wins from 1996–1999 and 55 wins from 2000–2003, the Mount Union Purple Raiders won a conference title in 23 of his 27 seasons; at Kehres' retirement, Mount Union had an ongoing streak of 21 conference titles. During his tenure, Kehres only lost eight games and tied three times in conference play. From 1994 to 2005, his squads won 100 consecutive games against Ohio Athletic Conference opponents. The 1994 season was the last under his tenure in which the Purple Raiders lost more than one game. Finally, his record of 72–3 (.960) in his final five seasons is the best in college football history, surpassing Tom Osborne's 60–3 (.952) in his final five seasons at Nebraska.

Kehres is 3–1 against college football's all-time winningest coach, John Gagliardi, having beaten Gagliardi's St. John's squads twice in playoff match-ups and traded wins in the national title game in 2000 and 2003.

In 2009, Kehres was named first vice president of the American Football Coaches Association (AFCA). He was elected President of the AFCA in January 2010. In 2013, Kehres retired after 27 years as head coach to become the Athletic Director of Mount Union.

Vince Kehres era (2013–2019)
Vince Kehres, who had previously served as defensive coordinator, was hired as the next head coach of Mount Union on May 8, 2013, replacing his father. During his time as coach Vince went 95–6 winning six OAC titles and two national titles in his seven years. He was named OAC Coach of the year three times. On January 13, 2020, it was announced that Vince was leaving the program to take a position with the Toledo Rockets. All together, Vince spent 13 years with Mount Union, eight of which were as defensive coordinator. He would leave the university with the highest winning percentage in program history.

Head coaching history

Championships
Through the 2022 season, the Purple Raiders have won 33 Ohio Athletic Conference (OAC) titles. They won their first OAC title in 1985 and repeated in 1986, followed by a third title in 1990. Beginning with their 1992 OAC championship, the team won 24 consecutive OAC titles, with their 2015 championship being the final in the streak.

Through the 2022 season, Mount Union has won 13 Division III National Championships and has 22 total appearances in the Stagg Bowl, including 11 consecutively, along with 33 playoff appearances.

Individual awards and achievements

NCAA Division III Player of the Year
 1993: Jim Ballard
 1996: Bill Borchert
 1997: Bill Borchert
 2001: Chuck Moore
 2002: Dan Pugh
 2008: Nate Kmic & Greg Micheli
 2013: Kevin Burke
 2014: Kevin Burke

Mike Gregory/Bob Packard Award
Awarded to the OAC's Most Valuable offensive back and offensive lineman. The award was renamed in 2008.

 1975: Gary Frost 
 1982: Dave McLaughlin 
 1983: Steve Harter & Tony Colao
 1985: Scott Woolf
 1986: Mike Groff & Scott Gindlesberger
 1987: Russ King
 1989: Mike Garn
 1990: Brad Petro & John Bouloubasis 
 1992: Jim Ballard & Mike Elder
 1993: Jim Ballard
 1994: Matt Johnson
 1996: Bill Borchert
 1997: Bill Borchert
 1998: J. W. Wearley
 1999: Tom Bauer
 2000: Gary Smeck & Jason Gerber
 2001: Ed Malone & Chuck Moore
 2002: Dan Pugh
 2003: Larry Kinnard
 2004: Zac Bruney
 2005: Jason Lewis
 2006: Jason Lewis
 2007: Greg Micheli
 2007: Derek Blanchard
 2008: Nate Kmic
 2012: Kevin Burke
 2014: Kevin Burke
 2017: D’Angelo Fulford
 2018: D’Angelo Fulford
 2019: D’Angelo Fulford
 2021: Braxton Plunk

OAC Defensive Player of the Year
 1984: Troy Starr

Paul Hoernemann Award
Awarded to the OAC's most valuable defensive lineman

 1985: John Heather
 1992: Mike Hallett
 1993: Mike Hallett
 1997: Jim Eismon
 1998: Jeremy Yoder
 2001: Matt Campbell
 2002: Matt Campbell
 2007: Pat McCullough
 2008: James Herbert
 2011: Charles Dieuseul
 2012: Matt Fechko
 2014: Tom Lally
 2015: Tom Lally

Ed Sherman Award
Awarded to the OAC's Most Valuable Receiver

 1988: Ed Hogya
 1992: Rob Atwood
 1993: Ed Bubonics
 1996: Kevin Knestrick
 1997: Kevin Knestrick
 1999: Adam Marino
 2000: Adam Marino
 2003: Randell Knapp
 2005: Scott Casto
 2006: Pierre Garçon
 2007: Pierre Garcon
 2008: Cecil Shorts
 2009: Cecil Shorts
 2017: Justin Hill
 2018: Justin Hill
 2019: Justin Hill
 2021: Wayne Ruby Jr.

Bill Edwards/Gene Slaughter Award
Awarded to the OAC's most valuable or top linebacker. The award was renamed.

 1990: Dave Lasecki
 1993: Rob Rodgers
 1994: Rob Rodgers
 1995: Mike Wenderfer
 1998: Jason Hall
 2000: Jesse Pearson
 2001: Jason Perkins
 2004: Shaun Spisak
 2005: Mike Gibbons
 2009: Sam Kershaw
 2012: Charles Dieuseul
 2015: Hank Spencer
 2018: Danny Robinson
 2021: Mason McMillen

Lee J. Tressel Award
Awarded to the OAC's most valuable defensive back.

 1996: Sean Moore
 1997: Mark Black
 1998: Kris Bugara
 2001: Chris Kern
 2002: Chris Kern
 2004: Jesse Clum
 2008: Daryl Ely
 2009: Drew McClain
 2011: Nick Driskill
 2012: Nick Driskill
 2014: Alex Kocheff
 2015: Tre Jones
 2018: Louis Berry IV
 2019: Kordell Ford
 2021: Malik Britt

Ken Wable Award
Awarded to the OAC's top offensive lineman.

 2011: Antonio Tate
 2012: Antonio Tate
 2016: Brooks Jenkins
 2017: Cole Parish
 2019: Sean Sherman
 2021: John Valentine

Clyde A. Lamb Award
The Clyde A. Lamb Award is presented annually to the top male and female senior scholar-athlete at each Ohio Athletic Conference institution.

 1985: Rick Marabito
 1986: Scott Woolf
 1987: Scott Gindlesberger
 1988: Joe Knoll
 1989: Paul Hrics
 1992: Jeff Bartolet
 1993: Eric Mysona
 1995: Richard Dine
 1998: Michael Altier
 1999: Darin Kershner
 2000: Tom Bauer
 2001: Matt LaVerde
 2002: Chuck Moore
 2003: Josh Liddell
 2004: Zac Bruney
 2006: Scott Casto
 2007: Eric Safran
 2008: Greg Micheli
 2009: Judd Lutz
 2011: Alex Ferrara
 2012: Nick Driskill
 2015: Hank Spencer
 2019: Louis Berry IV

First Team All-Americans
 1959: Bill Davis (QB/DB)
 1979: Paul Gulling (WR), Jeff Teece (DT)
 1985: Scott Woolf (QB), John Heather (DT)
 1986: Russ Kring (FB), Scott Gindlesberger (QB)
 1987: Russ Kring (FB)
 1990: Dave Lasecki (LB), Ken Edelman (K)
 1992: Jim Ballard (WB), Mike Elder (OT), Rob Atwood (TE), Chris Dattilio (LB)
 1993: Ed Bobonics (WR), Mike Hallett (DT), Rob Rodgers (LB),
 1994: Matt Johnson (OT)
 1995: Matt Liggett (DT), Mike Wenderfer (OG)
 1996: Bill Borchert (QB), Josh Weber (OT), Brian Wervey (LB), Josh Weimer (OT)
 1997: Bill Borchert (QB), Josh Weimer (OT), Vic Ricketts (OG)
 1998: Jason Hall (LB), Kris Bugara (DB), J.W. Wearley (OT)
 1999: Tom Bauer (C), Jason Gerber (OT), Adam Marino (WR)
 2000: Jason Gerber (OT), Gary Smeck (QB), Adam Marino (WR), Bill Rychel (OL)
 2001: Adam Indorf (OL), Todd Braden (DE), Matt Campbell (DE), Chris Kern (CB), Ed Malone (OL)
 2002: Matt Campbell (DE), Chris Kern (CB), Larry Kinnard (OL), Dan Pugh (RB)
 2003: Larry Kinnard (OL), Bob Bradley (OL), Shaun Spisak (LB)
 2004: Shaun Spisak (LB), Johnny Josef (DE)
 2005: Ross Watson (CB), Mike Gibbons (LB), Jason Lewis (OT)
 2006: Jason Lewis (OT), Justen Stickley (DE), Pierre Garçon (WR), Derek Blanchard (OL), Nate Kmic (RB)
 2007: Pierre Garcon (WR), Derek Blanchard (OL), Eric Safran (OL), Matt Kostelnik (DB), Nate Kmic (RB), Greg Micheli (QB), Patt McCullough (DT)
 2008: Nate Kmic (RB), Greg Micheli (QB), James Herbert (DL), Luke Summers (DL)
 2009: Cecil Shorts (WR), Sam Kershaw (LB)
 2010: Cecil Shorts (WR)
 2011: Brett Ekkens (OL), Charles Dieuseul (DL), Nick Driskill (DB)
 2012: Nick Driskill (DB), Antonio Tate (OL), Jasper Collins, Chris Denton (RET), Matt Mattox (OL) 
 2013: Kevin Burke (QB), Matt Fechko (DL)
 2014: Kevin Burke (QB), Alex Kocheff, Tom Lally
 2015: Alex Kocheff, Tom Lally, Mike Furda
 2016: Mitch Doraty, Brooks Jenkins, BJ Mitchell, Mike Vidal
 2017: Mike Vidal, Elijah Berry, Cole Parrish, Gabe Brown, Alex Louthan
 2018: Louis Berry IV, Danny Robinson, Andrew Roesch, D'Angelo Fulford

Notable alumni
  Kevin Burke, former Austrian Football League and Nationalliga A (American football) player. Two time NCAA Division III Player of the Year.
 Jim Ballard, former NFL Europe, XFL and CFL player. Inducted into the College Football Hall of Fame.
 Matt Campbell, current Iowa State Cyclones head coach
 Jason Candle, current Toledo Rockets head coach
 Dom Capers, former NFL head coach of the Carolina Panthers (1995–1998) and Houston Texans (2002–2005)
 Jasper Collins, current CFL player
 Wilmer Fleming, former NFL player
 Pierre Garcon, former NFL player, 2013 NFL receptions leader
 Alex Grinch, current USC Trojans defensive coordinator
 Larry Kehres, former Mount Union head coach
 Nate Kmic, former IFAF World Champion, IFAF World Championship MVP,  Vaahteraliiga pro player. All time leading rusher in college football history.
 Harry March, co-founder of the New York Giants and president of the American Football League (1936)
 Kyle Miller, former NFL player
 Kurt Rocco, former Arena Football League player
 Cecil Shorts, former NFL player, 2011 NFL Draft fourth-round pick
 Jeff Shreve, current public address announcer for the Cleveland Browns, Akron Zips football and Mid-American Conference
 Scott Woolf, former NFL player
 Nick Sirianni, current NFL head coach of the Philadelphia Eagles

References

External links
 

 
American football teams established in 1893
1893 establishments in Ohio